Perry Township is one of fourteen townships in Clinton County, Indiana. As of the 2010 census, its population was 1,459 and it contained 606 housing units.  The township was named for Oliver Hazard Perry, an American naval officer in the War of 1812.

History
The first white settler to arrive in what would become Perry Township was Elijah Rogers who erected a log cabin in 1827.  The township was established in September, 1834, created from a portion of Washington Township.

Geography

Cities and towns
 Colfax

Unincorporated towns
 Manson

Adjacent townships
 Washington Township (north)
 Jackson Township (east)
 Washington Township, Boone County (southeast)
 Sugar Creek Township, Boone County (south)
 Lauramie Township, Tippecanoe County (west)
 Sugar Creek Township, Montgomery County (west)

Major highways
  Interstate 65
  U.S. Route 52
  Indiana State Road 28

Cemeteries
The township contains six cemeteries: Davis, Loveless, Manson, McKendra, Plainview and Shilo.

Education
Perry Township is served by the Colfax-Perry Township Public Library.

References
 United States Census Bureau cartographic boundary files
 U.S. Board on Geographic Names

Townships in Clinton County, Indiana
1834 establishments in Indiana
Populated places established in 1834
Townships in Indiana